The New Zealand flag debate is a periodic question over whether the national flag should be changed. For several decades, alternative designs have been proposed, with varying degrees of support. There is no consensus among proponents of changing the flag as to which design should replace the current one. Common criticisms of the existing form of the New Zealand flag are its similarity to the Australian flag and the inappropriateness of retaining the Union Jack in the design. A series of polls conducted since the 1970s have shown that a majority of New Zealanders prefer the current flag.

New Zealand's Government held a two-stage binding referendum on a flag change in 2015 and 2016. The four designs chosen as finalists faced criticism for their similarity and reliance on sporting iconography more closely associated with a subset of the population. The referendum was also criticised as an expensive distraction from more important political issues—especially because of the overt endorsement of two silver fern flag designs by Kyle Lockwood (one of which was the flag design at top right) by then-Prime Minister John Key—and for the amateur nature of the crowd-sourced entries. Voters chose to retain the current flag, by a vote of 56.6% to 43.1%. Turnout in the referendum was 67%—relatively low compared to the 74-80% turnout in general elections in the 21st century. The referendum, especially the alternative designs offered, was mocked by commentators in New Zealand and abroad, and John Key named it as one of his main regrets when he announced his retirement from politics in 2016.

Arguments

Arguments for change 

Proponents for change argue that:

 The national flag is very similar to the flag of Australia and the two are often confused. While this is not unique among world flags, it is exacerbated by Australia and New Zealand's close ties and geographic proximity. For instance, in 1984 the Australian Prime Minister Bob Hawke was greeted by New Zealand flags when visiting Ottawa, and the former New Zealand prime minister John Key says he has been seated under the Australian flag in several international meetings. 
 As a derivative of the British Blue Ensign, it does not represent New Zealand's current status as an independent, sovereign nation. Instead it alludes to New Zealand being a colony of the United Kingdom, which is anachronistic. The flag debate is sometimes connected with republicanism in New Zealand (i.e. replacing the 'British' monarch with a republican New Zealand head of state).
 The national flag exclusively acknowledges those of British heritage whilst ignoring New Zealand's Māori population and other ethnic groups. Some have called this inappropriate because the Treaty of Waitangi and Māori heritage are significant parts of New Zealand's history, and because New Zealand is a multi-ethnic society with increasingly diverse demographics. For example, European New Zealanders dropped from 92% of the population in the 1961 census to 70.2% in the 2018 census, and included a greater diversity of European ethnic origins other than the British Isles. European New Zealanders no longer constitute the majority in Auckland, the largest city in New Zealand, which was ranked the third most ethnically diverse city in the world by the BBC in 2016.

Arguments against change 

Opponents to change argue that:

 The financial cost of a country changing its national flag outweighs any advantages.
 The national flag has not been changed for many years (it has "stood the test of time"). Many New Zealanders feel attached to the flag, because they grew up with it and because it has become part of the country's history; these events are what give the flag its symbolic and emotional value rather than the intrinsic design itself.
 The flag is already representative of New Zealand. The Union Jack in the flag represents New Zealand's strong past and present ties to the United Kingdom and its history as a part of the British Empire, and the Southern Cross represents its location in the South Pacific.
 Generations of young men from New Zealand who were drafted into the armies of New Zealand, the United Kingdom and the British Commonwealth have fought and died under the Union Jack or the current flag. Removing the Union Jack from the flag would be tantamount to disrespecting the efforts and sacrifice of these soldiers. The first time the current flag was officially flown in battle was from HMS Achilles during the Battle of the River Plate in 1939; however, the New Zealand national Blue Ensign flag was flown at Quinn's Post during the Gallipoli Campaign in 1915. Rhys Jones, former chief of the New Zealand Defence Force, noted that the flag had already been changed during New Zealand's history, and a salient legacy of the Gallipoli campaign is representational of the nation's independent identity.

History of debate

World War II 

During World War II, Prime Minister Peter Fraser received suggestions to include a Māori emblem on the flag. He deferred the matter until after the war, but never brought it up again.

1970s 
Debate on keeping or changing the New Zealand Flag started before May 1973, when a remit to change the flag, declare New Zealand a republic, and change the national anthem (then only "God Save the Queen") was voted down by the Labour Party at their national conference. At this time, proposals for changing the flag were typically linked with republicanism.

In November 1979, the Minister of Internal Affairs, Allan Highet, suggested that the design of the flag should be changed, and sought an artist to design a new flag with a silver fern on the fly. The proposal attracted little support.

1980s 
In 1988, Minister of Foreign Affairs Russell Marshall made a call for a flag change, which also had little effect.

The New Zealand Listener magazine held a flag design contest in 1989, attracting nearly 600 entries. Out of the seven semi-finalists, which included the national flag and the Flag of the United Tribes of New Zealand, the national flag won with a minority vote of 45.6%.

1990s 
In February 1992, the former Minister of Māori Affairs, Matiu Rata, called for a flag change "to re-establish our national identity".

In 1998, Prime Minister Jenny Shipley backed Cultural Affairs Minister Marie Hasler's call for the flag to be changed. Shipley, along with the New Zealand Tourism Board, supported the quasi-national silver fern flag, by using a white silver fern on a black background, along the lines of the Canadian Maple Leaf flag.

Both of these events were met with opposition from the Returned Services' Association.

2000s 

In 2004, the NZ Flag.com Trust was founded by businessman Lloyd Morrison with the aim of bringing about a non-binding referendum on the subject. Under New Zealand law, a referendum may be held on any issue if 10% of electors sign a petition which is presented to Parliament. The Trust launched their petition for such a referendum in 2005. Their campaign used a stylised silver fern flag designed by Cameron Sanders.

In response to the petition, the New Zealand Flag Institute was founded to oppose the referendum campaign and promote the current flag, as well as to offer a more scholarly view of the flag. The Royal New Zealand Returned and Services' Association (RNZRSA), the New Zealand organisation for war veterans, did not openly back the current flag at its annual conference, passing a remit that "It is the view of RNZRSA that any change to the New Zealand Flag should be solely the prerogative of the people of New Zealand as determined by a substantial majority of electors in a referendum. It is also the association's view that this matter should be taken out of the political arena."

The petition attracted 100,000 signatures out of the required approximately 270,000 and was withdrawn in July 2005, well before the general election in September. The NZ Flag.com Trust cited public apathy to change as the main reason for withdrawing the petition.

2010s 

On 5 August 2010, Labour list MP Charles Chauvel introduced a member's bill for a consultative commission followed by a referendum on the New Zealand flag.

In January 2014, Prime Minister John Key floated the idea of a referendum on a new flag at the 2014 general election. The proposal was met with mixed response. In March, Key announced that, should the National government be re-elected for a third term, the government would hold a nationwide referendum within the next three years asking whether or not to change the flag design. Following National's re-election later that year, the details of the referendum were announced.

2015–2016 referendums 

Shortly after the referendum announcement, party leaders reviewed draft legislation and selected candidates for a Flag Consideration Panel. The purpose of this group was to publicise the process, seek flag submissions and suggestions from the public, and decide on a final shortlist of options. Open consultation and design solicitation garnered 10,292 design suggestions from the public, later reduced to a longlist of 40 designs and then a shortlist of 4 designs to contend in the first referendum.

The first referendum took place between 20 November and 11 December 2015 and asked, "If the New Zealand flag changes, which flag would you prefer?" Voters were presented with several options selected by the Flag Consideration Panel. The black, white, and blue silver fern flag by Kyle Lockwood advanced to the second referendum.

The second referendum took place between 3 and 24 March 2016 and asked voters to choose between the selected alternative (the black, white and blue silver fern flag) and the existing New Zealand flag. The final decision was to retain the current flag, by a vote of 56.6% to 43.1%.

Reaction 
Reception of the process and the official options were highly critical, with no great enthusiasm shown among the public. From an aggregation of analyses, the consensus was that the referendum was "a bewildering process that seems to have satisfied few". Political communications professor Claire Robinson labelled the debate an example of groupthink, writing: "I can't figure how the panel can rationalise drawing on old symbols as a way of celebrating us as progressive."

Prime Minister John Key said that he was disappointed by the decision to retain the current flag, while stating he was pleased that the country had a valuable discussion about what it stood for. The failure of the referendum resulted in a loss of political prestige for Key.

Opinion polling

Two-option polls

Three-option polls

Four-option polls

Other 

In 2009, The New Zealand Herald surveyed various political party leaders and the twenty two members of the Order of New Zealand, with the results showing an even split.

Proposals

Silver fern flag 

The silver fern flag is a popular unofficial flag of New Zealand. The silver fern itself is a recognised national symbol, and its current and historic usage including:

 The coat of arms of New Zealand
 The artwork on the cover of the New Zealand passport
 The livery on aircraft operated by Air New Zealand
 The visual identity of several government bodies, including the logo of Immigration New Zealand
 The New Zealand one-dollar coin
 The Silver Ferns, New Zealand's national netball team
 The All Blacks, New Zealand's national rugby team
The Black Caps, New Zealand's national cricket team
 New Zealand Army Second Division military insignia
 New Zealand military insignia during the Second Boer War (1899–1902)
 All tombstones of fallen New Zealand soldiers maintained by the Commonwealth War Graves Commission contain a silver fern symbol
 New Zealand athletes competing in the boycotted 1980 Moscow Olympics competed under the NZOC flag, which is the silver fern flag superimposed over the Olympic rings.
 The NZ Flag.com Trust in their 2005 campaign

The proposal of replacing the national flag of New Zealand with the silver fern flag has been supported by then-Cultural Affairs Minister Marie Hasler, then-Prime Minister Jenny Shipley and the New Zealand Tourism Board in 1998, and then-Prime Minister John Key in 2010. Key later changed his preference to Kyle Lockwood's Silver Fern (Red, White & Blue) design, due to the similarity of the silver fern flag with the Jihadist black flag, used by Islamic extremist groups such as ISIL. Amongst the public, polls have shown that the silver fern is the most preferred alternative design for a new national flag.

The New Zealand Flag Institute objects to the silver fern flag, describing it as the logo of some of New Zealand's national sporting teams, and accordingly, not representative of the nation itself. This design originated from the All Blacks. The New Zealand Rugby Union has attempted to copyright claim silver fern flags.

2015 referendum shortlist 

On 1 September 2015, the Flag Consideration Panel announced the final four designs to be included in the first referendum. On 23 September, Prime Minister John Key confirmed the Red Peak flag would be added as a fifth option in the flag referendum after growing popular support for the design to be added to the referendum options.

Other designs 
An assortment of historical designs, and formal and informal proposals:

See also 
 Australian flag debate
 Great Canadian flag debate
 Northern Ireland flags issue

References

External links 

Flag debates – New Zealand History Online, Ministry for Culture and Heritage

Flag controversies